Robert Roland Chudnick (September 27, 1927 – May 27, 1994), known professionally as Red Rodney, was an American jazz trumpeter.

Biography
Born in Philadelphia, Pennsylvania, he became a professional musician at 15, working in the mid-1940s for the big bands of Jerry Wald, Jimmy Dorsey, Georgie Auld, Elliot Lawrence, Benny Goodman, and Les Brown. He was inspired by hearing Dizzy Gillespie and Charlie Parker to change his style to bebop, moving on to play with Claude Thornhill, Gene Krupa, and Woody Herman. He was Jewish.

He accepted an invitation from Charlie Parker to join his quintet. and was a member of the band from 1949 to 1951. Being the only white member of the group, when playing in the southern United States he was billed as "Albino Red" as a ruse to avoid prejudice against mixed race musical combos. During this time he recorded extensively.

During the 1950s, he worked as a bandleader in Philadelphia and recorded with Ira Sullivan. He became addicted to heroin and started a pattern of dropping in and out of jazz.

During 1969, Rodney played in Las Vegas with fellow Woody Herman colleague, trombonist Bill Harris, as part of the Flamingo casino house band led by Russ Black. Similar work continued through 1972.

In the early 1970s he was bankrupted by medical costs following a stroke. He returned to jazz. In 1975 he was incarcerated in Lexington, Kentucky for drug offenses. While jailed he gave music lessons to guitarist Wayne Kramer of the MC5.

He reunited with Ira Sullivan and performed with Dizzy Gillespie. From 1980 to 1982, Rodney made five albums with Sullivan. On these albums he started to play post bop jazz. He continued to work and record into the 1990s. He performed on a Charlie Parker tribute album by Charlie Watts, drummer for the Rolling Stones. He provided an early showcase for saxophonist Chris Potter, who was a member of his group and only 19 years old when Rodney recorded Red Alert in late 1990.

He performed at Jazz at Lincoln Center and the JVC Jazz Festival. He worked as an adviser for Bird, a movie about Charlie Parker directed by Clint Eastwood. Michael Zelniker played him in the movie.

Rodney died on May 27, 1994, from lung cancer.

Discography

As leader
 Modern Music from Chicago (Fantasy, 1956)
 Red Rodney: 1957 (Savoy, 1957)
 Red Rodney Returns (Argo, 1959)
 Broadway (Status, 1965)
 Bird Lives! (Muse, 1974)
 Superbop (Muse, 1974)
 Red Rodney with the Bebop Preservation Society (Spotlite, 1975)
 The Red Tornado (Muse, 1976)
 Yard's Pad (Sonet, 1976)
 Red, White and Blues (Muse, 1978)
 Home Free (Muse, 1979)
 Live at the Village Vanguard (Muse, 1980)
 Night and Day (Muse, 1981)
 Spirit Within with Ira Sullivan (Elektra Musician, 1982)
 The 3R's Richie Cole and Ricky Ford (Muse, 1982)
 Sprint (Elektra Musician, 1983)
 Hi Jinx at the Vanguard (Muse, 1984)
 Social Call with Charlie Rouse  (Uptown, 1984)
 Alive in New York (Muse, 1986)
 Red Giant (SteepleChase, 1988)
 Red Snapper (SteepleChase, 1988)
 Red Giant (SteepleChase, 1988)
 No Turn on Red (Denon, 1989)
 Code Red (Continuum, 1989)
 Then and Now (Chesky, 1992)

As sideman
 Dizzy Gillespie, To Diz with Love (Telarc, 1992)
 Woody Herman, The Fourth Herd (Jazzland, 1960)
 Clifford Jordan, Dr. Chicago (Bee Hive, 1985)
 Lee Konitz, Live at Laren (Soul Note, 1984)
 Gene Krupa, Gene Krupa's Sidekicks (Columbia, 1955)
 Elliot Lawrence, The Uncollected Elliot Lawrence and His Orchestra 1946 (Hindsight, 1982)
 Charlie Parker, Bird at St. Nick's (Jazz Workshop, 1957)
 Charlie Parker, Swedish Schnapps (Verve, 1958)
 Ali Ryerson, Blue Flute (Red Baron, 1992)
 Ira Sullivan, Ira Sullivan Does It All (Muse, 1983)
 Bob Thiele, Louis Satchmo (Red Baron, 1992)
 Claude Thornhill, The Uncollected Claude Thornhill and His Orchestra (Hindsight, 1977)

References

Sources
 Fresh Air on WHYY, December 30, 2002
 Morton, Richard and Cook, Brian. The Penguin Guide to Jazz, New Edition, London, Penguin, 1994
 Morton, Richard and Cook, Brian. The Penguin Guide to Jazz on CD, sixth Edition, London, Penguin, 2002,

External links
 

1927 births
1994 deaths
20th-century trumpeters
American jazz trumpeters
American male trumpeters
American people convicted of drug offenses
Bebop trumpeters
Hard bop trumpeters
Musicians from Philadelphia
Chesky Records artists
Muse Records artists
Savoy Records artists
Jazz musicians from Pennsylvania
20th-century American male musicians
American male jazz musicians
Jewish jazz musicians
Uptown Records (jazz) artists
Fantasy Records artists
Deaths from lung cancer in Florida